Chabot College (Chabot or CC) is a public community college in Hayward, California. It is part of the Chabot-Las Positas Community College District.

History
Chabot College was the first college opened by the Chabot-Las Positas Community College District. The formation of a “junior college district” was approved by the voters on January 10, 1961, and the first board of trustees elected on April 18, 1961. Chabot College opened for classes on September 11, 1961, on a  temporary site in San Leandro with an enrollment of 1,163 students. The  Chabot College site on Hesperian Boulevard in Hayward opened for its first day of classes on September 20, 1965.

The college primarily serves residents of Alameda County in the East Bay area (generally the suburban region south of Oakland), including the district communities of Hayward, Castro Valley, San Leandro, San Lorenzo and Union City.

The school is named for noted Bay Area entrepreneur Anthony Chabot.

Organization and administration 
The president is Susan Sperling.

Academic profile 
Chabot offers a curriculum of over 175 majors of study, awarding more than 100 associate degrees and certificates.  Chabot is on a semester system.

The college features six academic divisions: Applied Technology and Business, Language Arts, Math and Sciences, Physical Education and Health, the College of the Arts, and Social Sciences.  The Business program offers degrees in Business, Accounting, Retail Management, Business Management, Marketing and certificates in various areas, including Accounting, Health Care Management, Human Resources Assistant, Entrepreneurship, Real Estate, Marketing, Retailing, Management, etc.

Accreditation

Chabot College is accredited by the Accrediting Commission for Community and Junior Colleges. Specific programs are accredited by the Council on Dental Education, American Dental Association, the Committee on Allied Health Education and Accreditation in collaboration with the American Hospital Health Information, Management Association, and the America Medical Assisting Association. The program in nursing is accredited by the California Board of Registered Nursing. The college is approved by the California State Department of Education and is a member of the American Association of Community and Junior Colleges and the Community College League of California. Chabot College is an accredited institutional member of the National Association of Schools of Art and Design.

Educational paths
Chabot provides the following academic pathways:
 Technical and career-vocational education programs
 Transfer education programs to four-year universities
 General education
 Basic skills instruction
 English as a second language programs
 Community and continuing Education programs
 Radio & Television Broadcasting

Student life

Radio station KCRH
KCRH is an 18 watt radio station operated by the mass communications class at Chabot.

Television station KCTH 27

Chabot College's Television Studio was established when the College first opened in 1964. It was the first West Coast College Television Station with 5 On Campus Channels that allowed instructors to receive 5 independent cable TV feeds of programming from the studio. Lately, it became the Community Media Center for the East bay by taking over Public-access television channels from Comcast due to the DIVCA (Digital Infrastructure Video Communications Act). Which makes the Studio available to the communities as well as for Educational-access television use. Local business and Individuals can now use the Leased access High Definition Studios, with access to over 100,000 viewers and on line streaming as well as AT&T-U-viewers. Currently the Station runs KCTH 27 the Educational-access television channel, KCMC 28 and 29, also Channel 99 under Hayward on AT&T U-verse.  It is growing in programming and equipment.

Sport 
In 1987 the Chabot College ultimate disc team won the intercollegiate national championship.

The Bay Area Ambassadors soccer team has played at the Gladiator Stadium from 2009-2012.

Noted people

Notable alumni

Jeff Barnes, former NFL player
Cliff Burton, bassist for the heavy metal band Metallica
Lester Conner, basketball coach
Stephanie Chandler, entrepreneur and author
Mark Davis, Major League Baseball pitcher
Tim Davis, football player
Ed Galigher, defensive lineman for the NFL's San Francisco 49ers and New York Jets
Chris Geile, offensive lineman for the NFL's Detroit Lions
Tom Hanks, Academy Award-winning actor
Bruce Henderson, journalist and author
Robert Jenkins, former NFL player
Stevie Johnson, wide receiver for the NFL's San Francisco 49ers
Von Joshua, Major League Baseball outfielder
Eric Lane, former NFL player
Darren Lewis, Major League Baseball outfielder
Lorenzo Lynch, former NFL player
Bip Roberts, All-Star Major League Baseball second baseman
Brandon Kolb, Major League Baseball pitcher
Aaron Ledesma, Major League Baseball infielder
Mike McRae, Olympic long jumper
Carl Potts, comic book artist
Rick Rodriguez, Major League Baseball pitcher
Nate Schierholtz, outfielder with the Chicago Cubs major league baseball team
Junior Tautalatasi, former NFL player
Adrian Ward, former NFL player
Ned Yost, former Milwaukee Brewers and current Kansas City Royals manager
Mike Young, Major League Baseball outfielder
Doug Padilla, USA Olympic distance runner
Tamara De Treaux, actress who played E.T. the Extra-Terrestrial
Lyle West, former NFL football player with NY Giants, played in Super Bowl XXXV

Faculty
Marshall Drummond, business professor
Helen Feyler-Switz, art instructor
S. Floyd Mori, economics professor

References

External links
Official website

 
1961 establishments in California
California Community Colleges
Education in Hayward, California
Educational institutions established in 1961
Schools accredited by the Western Association of Schools and Colleges
Universities and colleges in Alameda County, California